In mathematics, a Catanese surface is one of the  surfaces of general type introduced by .

Construction
The construction starts with a quintic V with 20 double points. Let W be the surface obtained by blowing up the 20 double points. Suppose that W has a double cover X branched over the 20 exceptional −2-curves. Let Y be obtained from X by blowing down the 20 −1-curves in X. If there is a group of order 5 acting freely on all these surfaces, then the quotient Z of Y by this group of order 5 is a Catanese surface. Catanese found a 4-dimensional family of curves constructed like this.

Invariants
The Catanese surface is a numerical Campedelli surface and hence has Hodge diamond

and canonical degree .

References

Algebraic surfaces
Complex surfaces